André Michel Lwoff (8 May 1902 – 30 September 1994) was a French microbiologist and Nobel laureate of Russian-Polish origin.

Education, early life and career
Lwoff was born in Ainay-le-Château, Allier, in Auvergne, France, the son of Marie (Siminovitch), an artist, and Solomon Lwoff, a psychiatrist. He joined the Institute Pasteur in Paris when he was 19 years old. In 1932, he finished his PhD and, with the help of a grant from the Rockefeller Foundation, moved with his wife and co-researcher Marguerite Lwoff to the Kaiser Wilhelm Institute for Medical Research of Heidelberg to Otto Meyerhof, where he did research on the development of flagellates. Another Rockefeller grant allowed him go to the University of Cambridge in 1937. In 1938, he was appointed departmental head at the Institut Pasteur, where he did groundbreaking research on bacteriophages, microbiota and on the poliovirus.

Awards and honors
He was awarded numerous prizes from the French Académie des Sciences, the Grand Prix Charles-Leopold Mayer, the Leeuwenhoek Medal of the Royal Netherlands Academy of Arts and Sciences in 1960 and the Keilin Medal of the British Biochemical Society in 1964. He was awarded a Nobel Prize in Medicine in 1965 for the discovery of the mechanism that some viruses (which he named proviruses) use to infect bacteria. He was an elected member of the United States National Academy of Sciences, the American Academy of Arts and Sciences, and the American Philosophical Society. Throughout his career he partnered with his wife Marguerite Lwoff although he gained considerably more recognition. Lwoff was elected a Foreign Member of the Royal Society (ForMemRS) in 1958. Lwoff was also president of the FEMS for a term of two years from 1974. The FEMS-Lwoff Award in microbiology is named in his honour.

Personal life
Lwoff was married to the microbiologist and virologist Marguerite Lwoff with whom he published many works. He was also a humanist against capital punishment.

References

External links
 

1902 births
1994 deaths
Nobel laureates in Physiology or Medicine
French Nobel laureates
People from Allier
Members of the European Molecular Biology Organization
French humanists
French microbiologists
French virologists
Phage workers
Foreign Members of the Royal Society
Members of the French Academy of Sciences
Foreign associates of the National Academy of Sciences
Leeuwenhoek Medal winners
Pasteur Institute
Presidents of the International Union of Microbiological Societies
Members of the American Philosophical Society